The European Solar Prizes are a series of awards which have been given annually since 1994 by the European Association for Renewable Energy (EUROSOLAR) located in Bonn, Germany. The prizes are awarded to individuals or organizations for outstanding contributions to the utilization and applications of renewable energy in all its available forms.

Selection
The competition for the European Solar Prizes is run concurrently in several European countries, through the different EUROSOLAR section members. All winners of the European Solar Prizes are selected from the entrants for the national Solar Prizes in each country and from the applications directly received at EUROSOLAR Germany.

The entrants for the national Solar Prizes are selected in the following European countries:
 Austria
 Bulgaria
 Czech Republic
 Denmark
 France
 Germany
 Hungary
 Italy
 Luxembourg
 Spain
 Turkey
 Ukraine
 United Kingdom

Award categories
The European Solar Prizes are presented in the following categories: 
 Towns/municipalities, council districts, municipal utilities
 Industrial and commercial companies or farmers
 Owners or users of installations utilizing renewable energy
 Local or regional associations promoting renewable energy projects
 Solar architecture and urban planning
 Media
 Transport systems with renewable energy
 Education and vocational training
 One-world co-operation
 Special achievement prize for outstanding individual commitment

See also
 Solar energy in the European Union
 List of environmental awards

External links
 European Association for Renewable Energy

Environmental awards
European science and technology awards
Solar energy in the European Union